Kuroshioturris albogemmata is a species of sea snail, a marine gastropod mollusk in the family Turridae, the turrids.

Description
The length of the shell attains 20 mm.

Distribution
This marine species occurs off Japan and the Philippines.

References

 Kuroda, T.; Habe, T.; Oyama, K. (1971). The sea shells of Sagami Bay. Maruzen Co., Tokyo. xix, 1-741 (Japanese text), 1-489 (English text), 1-51 (Index), pls 1-121

External links
  Tucker, J.K. 2004 Catalog of recent and fossil turrids (Mollusca: Gastropoda). Zootaxa 682:1-1295
 Gastropods.com: Kuroshioturris albogemmata

albogemmata
Gastropods described in 1971